Jyoti swarupini (pronounced jyōti swarūpini) is a ragam in Carnatic music (musical scale of South Indian classical music). It is the 68th Melakarta rāgam in the 72 melakarta rāgam system of Carnatic music. It is the prati madhyamam equivalent of Ragavardhini, which is the 32nd melakarta. It is called Jyōtirāga or Joti or Jyōti in Muthuswami Dikshitar school of Carnatic music.

Structure and Lakshana

It is the 2nd rāgam in the 12th chakra Aditya. The mnemonic name for this rāgam is Aditya-Sri. The mnemonic phrase is sa ru gu mi pa dha ni. Its ascending and descending scale ( structure) is as follows:
: 
: 

See swaras in Carnatic music for details on above notation. The notes used are shatsruthi rishabham, antara gandharam, prati madhyamam, shuddha dhaivatham, kaisiki nishadham.

Jyotiswarupini, being a melakarta rāgam, by definition is a sampoorna rāgam (it has all seven notes in ascending and descending scale).

Janya rāgams 
A few minor janya rāgams (derived scales) are associated with Jyotiswarupini. See List of janya rāgams for full list of janya rāgams associated with this and other melakarta rāgams.

Compositions
Here are a few compositions set to this parent musical scale.
Anandamayamanave by (Walajapet Venkataramana Bhagavathar)
Gaanamrutha paanam by Koteeswara Iyer
Jyotiswaroopini by Periyasaamy Thooran
Sri Gayatri baktha durita by Dr. M. Balamuralikrishna
Adineepai

Related rāgams
This section covers the theoretical and scientific aspect of this rāgam.

Jyotiswarupini's notes when shifted using Graha bhedam does not yield any other melakarta rāgam. Graha bhedam is the step taken in keeping the relative note frequencies same, while shifting the shadjam to the next note in the rāgam.

Notes

References

Melakarta ragas